This is a list of some of the breeds and types of horse considered in India to be wholly or partly of Indian origin. Some may have complex or obscure histories, so inclusion here does not necessarily imply that a breed is predominantly or exclusively Indian.

Breeds

 Bhutia
 Chummarti
 Deccani
 Kathiawari
 Manipuri Pony
 Marwari
 Sikang
 Sindhi
 Spiti
 Zaniskari

Types
 Indian Country-bred
 Indian Half-bred

References

 01
Horse
Indian horse breeds